The United States has maintained diplomatic relations with Mexico since 1823, when Andrew Jackson was appointed Envoy Extraordinary and Minister Plenipotentiary to that country. Jackson declined the appointment, however, and Joel R. Poinsett became the first U.S. envoy to Mexico in 1825. The rank of the U.S. chief of mission to Mexico was raised from Envoy Extraordinary and Minister Plenipotentiary  to Ambassador Extraordinary and Plenipotentiary in 1898.

Normal diplomatic relations between the United States and Mexico have been interrupted on four occasions:
 From December 28, 1836, to July 7, 1839 (following the secession of Texas)
 From March 28, 1845, to October 2, 1848 (during the Mexican–American War)
 From June 21, 1858, to April 6, 1859 (during the War of the Reform)
 From March 18, 1913, to March 3, 1917 (during the Mexican Revolution; the U.S. embassy was closed on April 22, 1914, following the U.S. occupation of Veracruz). Ambassador Henry Lane Wilson was recalled after being implicated in a plot (La decena trágica) to overthrow President Francisco I. Madero. Rather than immediately formally appoint a new ambassador, Woodrow Wilson dispatched ex-Minnesota Governor John Lind as his personal envoy to handle Mexican diplomatic affairs.

In addition, the U.S. legation in Mexico was headed by an interim Chargé d'Affaires from April 1864 to August 1867, during the final years of the French Intervention.

List of ambassadors
The following is a list of Ambassadors the United States has sent to Mexico, and other representatives that have served a similar function. The exact title given by the United States State Department to this position currently is "Ambassador Extraordinary and Plenipotentiary."

Mexico achieved independence from Spain in 1821; so the first three men on this list were sent by President Madison during the Mexican War of Independence (1810–1821). William Shaler participated in the 1812–13 Gutiérrez–Magee Expedition, which was a private military campaign to overthrow the Royalists and resulted in the roadside murder of two provincial governors and about a dozen other officials.

See also
 Ambassador of Mexico to the United States
 Ambassadors of the United States
 Embassy of the United States, Mexico City
 Foreign relations of Mexico
 Mexico–United States relations

References

 United States Department of State: Background notes on Mexico

External links
 United States Department of State: Chiefs of Mission for Mexico
 United States Department of State: Mexico
 United States Embassy in Mexico City

Mexico
 
United States